Patit Pawan Mandir is a Hindu temple in Ratnagiri, Maharashtra, India. It was established by Vinayak Damodar Savarkar, and built by Shriman Bhagojisheth Keer on February 22, 1931.

In Popular culture 
A Hindi film by Sudhir Phadke on the life of Savarkar was shot in Ratnagiri and has scenes shot in Patit Pawan Mandir. This film was in fact the last film for which Phadke last sang and composed music.

References

Further reading
Kane, Pandurang Vaman: History of Dharmasastra: (ancient and mediaeval, religious and civil law) — Poona : Bhandarkar Oriental Research Institute, 1962–1975

External links 
 
 Articles on caste by Koenraad Elst:
Caste in India
Buddhism and Caste
Indian tribals and Caste
Physical anthropology and Caste
Etymology of Varna

Hindu temples in Maharashtra